Adel (Äźel) is a rural locality (a village) in Tanalyksky Selsoviet, Khaybullinsky District, Bashkortostan, Russia. The population was 159 as of 2010. There are 3 streets.

Geography 
Adel is located 42 km northeast of Akyar (the district's administrative centre) by road. Mambetovo is the nearest rural locality.

References 

Rural localities in Khaybullinsky District